John M. Chambers may refer to:
 John Chambers (statistician) (John McKinley Chambers), creator of the S programming language and core member of the R programming language project
 John M. Chambers (politician), Irish-American businessman and politician from New York

See also
 John Chambers (disambiguation)